A Wiggers diagram, named after its developer, Carl Wiggers, is a unique diagram that has been used in teaching cardiac physiology for more than a century. In the Wiggers diagram, the X-axis is used to plot time subdivided into the cardiac phases, while the Y-axis typically contains the following on a single grid:
 Blood pressure
 Aortic pressure
 Ventricular pressure
 Atrial pressure
 Ventricular volume
 Electrocardiogram
 Arterial flow (optional)
 Heart sounds (optional)

The Wiggers diagram clearly illustrates the coordinated variation of these values as the heart beats, assisting one in understanding the entire cardiac cycle.

Events

Note that during isovolumetric/isovolumic contraction and relaxation, all the heart valves are closed; at no time are all the heart valves open. *S3 and S4 heart sounds are associated with pathologies and are not routinely heard.

Additional images

See also
 Pressure volume diagram

References 

Blood pressure
Cardiovascular physiology